Woodson County (standard abbreviation: WO) is a county located in the U.S. state of Kansas. As of the 2020 census, the county population was 3,115. Its county seat is Yates Center.

History

Early history

For many millennia, the Great Plains of North America was inhabited by nomadic Native Americans.  From the 16th century to 18th century, the Kingdom of France claimed ownership of large parts of North America.  In 1762, after the French and Indian War, France secretly ceded New France to Spain, per the Treaty of Fontainebleau.

19th century
In 1802, Spain returned most of the land to France, but keeping title to about 7,500 square miles.  In 1803, most of the land for modern day Kansas was acquired by the United States from France as part of the 828,000 square mile Louisiana Purchase for 2.83 cents per acre.

In 1854, the Kansas Territory was organized, then in 1861 Kansas became the 34th U.S. state.  In 1855, Woodson County was established. Fort Belmont was used during the Civil War and had received refugees from the Trail of Blood on Ice. Opothleyahola is buried in an unmarked grave next to his daughter who died at the fort.

Geography

Adjacent counties
 Coffey County (north)
 Anderson County (northeast)
 Allen County (east)
 Neosho County (southeast)
 Wilson County (south)
 Greenwood County (west)

Demographics

As of the census of 2000, there were 3,788 people, 1,642 households, and 1,052 families residing in the county.  The population density was 8 people per square mile (3/km2).  There were 2,076 housing units at an average density of 4 per square mile (2/km2).  The racial makeup of the county was 96.96% White, 0.82% Black or African American, 0.87% Native American, 0.05% Asian, 0.24% from other races, and 1.06% from two or more races.  1.37% of the population were Hispanic or Latino of any race.

There were 1,642 households, out of which 25.80% had children under the age of 18 living with them, 53.80% were married couples living together, 7.40% had a female householder with no husband present, and 35.90% were non-families. 33.30% of all households were made up of individuals, and 19.40% had someone living alone who was 65 years of age or older.  The average household size was 2.24 and the average family size was 2.83.

In the county, the population was spread out, with 21.70% under the age of 18, 7.40% from 18 to 24, 22.10% from 25 to 44, 23.90% from 45 to 64, and 24.80% who were 65 years of age or older.  The median age was 44 years. For every 100 females there were 96.80 males.  For every 100 females age 18 and over, there were 96.80 males.

The median income for a household in the county was $25,335, and the median income for a family was $31,369. Males had a median income of $23,950 versus $16,135 for females. The per capita income for the county was $14,283.  About 10.20% of families and 13.20% of the population were below the poverty line, including 17.20% of those under age 18 and 13.20% of those age 65 or over.

Government

Presidential elections

Woodson County is powerfully Republican. The only Democrat to win a majority in the county was Franklin D. Roosevelt in 1932, although Woodrow Wilson won a plurality in 1912. In contrast, Charles Evans Hughes in 1916 & George H. W. Bush in 1992 are the only Republican winners of the county who only managed to win a plurality of its votes.

Education

Unified school districts
 Woodson USD 366

Communities

Cities
 Yates Center
 Toronto
 Neosho Falls

Unincorporated communities
† means a Census-Designated Place (CDP) by the United States Census Bureau.
 Cookville
 Durand
 Piqua†
 Vernon

Ghost towns
 Defiance - located six miles east of Yates Center, its population moved to Yates Center after it was selected as the permanent county seat in 1876
 Kalida - located two miles south of Yates Center, its population moved to Yates Center after it was selected as the permanent county seat in 1876

Townships
Woodson County is divided into six townships.  The city of Yates Center is considered governmentally independent and is excluded from the census figures for the townships.  In the following table, the population center is the largest city (or cities) included in that township's population total, if it is of a significant size.

See also

References

Further reading

 Standard Atlas of Woodson County, Kansas; Geo. A. Ogle & Co; 38 pages; 1904.

External links

County
 
 Woodson County - Directory of Public Officials
Maps
 Woodson County maps: Current, Historic, KDOT
 Kansas Highway maps: Current, Historic, KDOT
 Kansas Railroad maps: Current, 1996, 1915, KDOT and Kansas Historical Society

 
Kansas counties
1855 establishments in Kansas Territory